This article contains information about the literary events and publications of 1924.

Events
January
Writer Miguel de Unamuno is dismissed for the first time from his university posts by the Spanish dictator General Miguel Primo de Rivera and goes into exile on Fuerteventura in the Canary Islands.
Richard L. Simon and M. Lincoln ("Max") Schuster establish the New York City publisher Simon & Schuster, which initially specializes in crossword puzzle books.
January 15 – The world's first radio play, Danger by Richard Hughes, is broadcast by the B.B.C. from its London studios.
February 2 – A largely rewritten version of Roi Cooper Megrue and Walter C. Hackett's 1914 farce It Pays to Advertise opens in a production by actor-manager Tom Walls, at the Aldwych Theatre in London. It runs until 10 July 1925, a total of 598 performances, as the first in a sequence of twelve Aldwych farces.
March 3 – Seán O'Casey's drama Juno and the Paycock opens at the Abbey Theatre, Dublin.
March
Leonard and Virginia Woolf move themselves and the Hogarth Press back to a house in Bloomsbury at 52 Tavistock Square, London.
Weird Tales magazine publishes H. P. Lovecraft's story "The Rats in the Walls" in the United States.
April – Ford Madox Ford publishes the first of four volumes set around World War I, titled Parade's End. It is completed in 1928.
April 12 – The Indian poet Rabindranath Tagore arrives in China, where his views prove controversial. While there, he becomes associated with the innovative poets Xu Zhimo and Lin Huiyin.
May 3 – F. Scott and Zelda Fitzgerald leave New York for France.
June – Ret Marut, perhaps previously Otto Feige and presumed later to be the writer B. Traven, leaves Europe for Mexico.
June 4 – E. M. Forster's novel A Passage to India is published in the U.K. He will write no further fiction in the remaining 46 years of his life.
September – Buddenbrooks, the first of Thomas Mann's works to appear in English, is published in a translation by the American Helen T. Lowe-Porter. The original German appeared in 1901.
unknown dates
The Hebrew language poet Hayim Nahman Bialik relocates with his publishing house Dvir from Berlin to Tel Aviv.
The Argosy Book Store is founded in New York City.

New books

Fiction
Felix Aderca – Moartea unei republici roșii
Michael Arlen – The Green Hat
Henry Howarth Bashford (anonymously) – Augustus Carp, Esq., By Himself: Being the Autobiography of a Really Good Man
Johan Bojer – Vor egen stamme (The Emigrants)
Lynn Brock – The Deductions of Colonel Gore
Louis Bromfield – The Green Bay Tree
John Buchan – The Three Hostages
Edgar Rice Burroughs
The Land That Time Forgot
Tarzan and the Ant Men
Agatha Christie
The Man in the Brown Suit
Poirot Investigates
Freeman Wills Crofts – Inspector French's Greatest Case
James Oliver Curwood – A Gentleman of Courage
Alfred Döblin – Berge Meere und Giganten (Mountains, Seas and Giants)
Johan Fabricius – De Scheepsjongens van Bontekoe (The Cabin Boys of Bontekoe)
Edna Ferber – So Big
Charles Finger – Tales from Silver Lands
Dorothy Canfield Fisher – The Home-Maker
Ford Madox Ford – Some Do Not . . .
Jean Forge – Saltego trans Jarmiloj
E. M. Forster – A Passage to India
Gilbert Frankau – Gerald Cranston's Lady
John Galsworthy – The White Monkey
Garet Garrett – Satan's Bushel
Zane Grey – Call of the Canyon
Robert Hichens – After the Verdict
Winifred Holtby – The Crowded Street
Margaret Irwin – Still She Wished for Company
Mikheil Javakhishvili – Kvachi Kvachantiradze
Harry Stephen Keeler – The Voice of the Seven Sparrows
Margaret Kennedy – The Constant Nymph
Magdalen King-Hall (as Cleone Knox) – Diary of a Young Lady of Fashion 1764–65
Halldór Laxness – Undir Helgahnúk
Benito Lynch – The Englishman of the Bones
Philip MacDonald – The Rasp
Thomas Mann – The Magic Mountain (Der Zauberberg)
Lucia Mantu – Cucoana Olimpia
Katherine Mansfield – Something Childish and Other Stories
John Masefield – Sard Harker
F. M. Mayor – The Rector's Daughter
Herman Melville (d. 1891) – Billy Budd, Sailor
Dmitry Merezhkovsky – Akhnaton, King of Egypt
Hope Mirrlees - The Counterplot
George Moore – Peronnik the Fool
Paul Morand – Lewis and Irene
Ralph Hale Mottram – The Spanish Farm
E. Phillips Oppenheim – The Wrath to Come
Baroness Orczy
The Honourable Jim
Pimpernel and Rosemary
Les Beaux et les Dandys de Grand Siècles en Angleterre
 E. Phillips Oppenheim –  The Ex-Duke
Ernest Pérochon – Les Gardiennes
Eden Phillpotts – The Treasures of Typhon
Edward Plunkett, 18th Baron of Dunsany – The King of Elfland's Daughter
Joseph Roth
Hotel Savoy
Rebellion
Arthur Schnitzler – Fräulein Else
Arthur D. Howden Smith – Porto Bello Gold
Cecil Street – The Double Florin
Þórbergur Þórðarson – Bréf til Láru
Edgar Wallace 
The Dark Eyes of London
Double Dan
The Face in the Night 
Room 13
The Sinister Man
The Three Oak Mystery
Hugh Walpole – The Old Ladies
Mary Webb – Precious Bane
H. G. Wells – The Dream
Edith Wharton – The Old Maid
Walter F. White – The Fire In The Flint
P. C. Wren – Beau Geste
Francis Brett Young
Cold Harbour
Woodsmoke 
Yevgeny Zamyatin – We (first published, in English translation)

Children and young people
Edgar Rice Burroughs
The Land That Time Forgot
Tarzan and the Ant Men
Hugh Lofting – Doctor Dolittle's Circus (4th in a series of 13 books)
Anne Parrish – The Dream Coach
Albert Payson Terhune – The Heart of a Dog
Ruth Plumly Thompson – Grampa in Oz (18th in the Oz series overall and the fourth written by her)
Else Ury
Nesthäkchen's Youngest (Nesthäkchens Jüngste)
Nesthäkchen and Her Grandchildren (Nesthäkchen und Ihre Enkel)*Gertrude Chandler Warner – The Box-Car Children

Drama
Maxwell Anderson and Laurence Stallings – What Price Glory?
Louis Aragon – Backs to the Wall
Bertolt Brecht – The Life of Edward II of England (Leben Eduards des Zweiten von England, adapted from Marlowe)
Mikhail Bulgakov – The Fatal Eggs (Роковые яйца)
Alberto Casella – La morte in vacanza (Death Takes a Holiday)
Noël Coward
The Vortex (first performed)
Hay Fever (written)
Easy Virtue (written)
Ramón del Valle-Inclán – Bohemian Lights (Luces de Bohemia)
Henri Duvernois and Pierre Wolff – After Love
Nikolai Erdman – The Mandate (Мандат)
 Ian Hay – The Sport of Kings
Agha Hashar Kashmiri – Aankh ka Nasha
George S. Kaufman and Marc Connelly – Beggar on Horseback
Frederick Lonsdale 
The Fake
The Street Singer
Ivor Novello – The Rat
Seán O'Casey – Juno and the Paycock
Eugene O'Neill – Desire Under the Elms
E. Phillips Oppenheim – The Passionate Quest
Louis N. Parker – Our Nell
Henrik Rytter – Herman Ravn
Githa Sowerby – The Stepmother (written)
Sergei Tretyakov – The Gas Masks (Противогазы)
Tristan Tzara – Handkerchief of Clouds (Mouchoir de Nuages)
Sutton Vane – Falling Leaves
Stanisław Ignacy Witkiewicz – The Mother (Matka)

Poetry

Edwin James Brady – The Land of the Sun
Muhammad Iqbal – Bang-i-Dara
A. A. Milne – When We Were Very Young
Pablo Neruda – Twenty Love Poems and a Song of Despair (Veinte poemas de amor y una canción desesperada)
Saint-John Perse – Anabase
Jean-Joseph Rabearivelo – La Coupe de cendres (The cup of ashes)
Sergei Yesenin – Land of Scoundrels

Non-fiction
Alfred Rosling Bennett – London and Londoners in the 1850s and 1860s
Sarah Bernhardt – The Art of the Theatre
W. E. B. Du Bois – The Gift of Black Folk
Emma Goldman – My Further Disillusionment in Russia
Johan Huizinga – Erasmus
Agnes Mure Mackenzie – The Women in Shakespeare's Plays
Eileen Power – Medieval People
Robert Athlyi Rogers – Holy Piby
Jadunath Sarkar – History of Aurangzib
Lowell Thomas – With Lawrence in Arabia
Leon Trotsky – Literature and Revolution
Jim Tully – Beggars of Life
Mark Twain – The Autobiography of Mark Twain
Hugh Walpole – The English Novel: Some Notes on its Evolution
H. G. Wells – The Story of a Great Schoolmaster
Margaret Wylie – Golden Wattle Cookery Book

Births
January 30 – Lloyd Alexander, American writer (died 2007)
February 3 – Andrzej Szczypiorski, Polish writer (died 2000)
February 6 – Jin Yong, Chinese wuxia novelist (died 2018)
February 17 – Margaret Truman, novelist (died 2008)
April 3 
 Errol Brathwaite, New Zealand author (died 2005)
 Josephine Pullein-Thompson, English children's novelist (died 2014)
April 8 – Humberto Costantini, Argentinian writer (died 1987)
April 20 – Miroslav Komárek, Czech historical linguist (died 2013)
April 24
Clement Freud, German-born English writer and broadcaster (died 2009)
Clive King, English children's writer and academic (died 2018)
April 26 – Solomon Mutswairo, Zimbabwean novelist and poet (died 2005)
May 1 – Terry Southern, American writer (died 1995)
May 3 – Yehuda Amichai, born Ludwig Pfeuffer, German-born Israeli Hebrew-language poet (died 2000)
May 8 – Petru Dumitriu, Romanian novelist (died 2002)
July 1 – Wang Huo, Chinese novelist and screenwriter 
July 15 – Finn Bjørnseth, Norwegian novelist (died 1973)
July 30 
 William H. Gass, American novelist (died 2017)
 José Antonio Villarreal, Chicano novelist (died 2010)
August 3 – Leon Uris, American author (died 2003)
August 6 – James Baldwin, American writer (died 1987)
August 15 – Robert Bolt, English screenwriter and playwright (died 1995)
August 17 – Evan S. Connell, American author (died 2013)
August 22 – Ada Jafri, Indian poet writing in Urdu (died 2015)
September 4 – Joan Aiken, English novelist (died 2004)
September 14 – Davidson Nicol, Sierra Leonean diplomat, author (died 1994)
September 27 – Josef Škvorecký, Czech-born novelist and publisher (died 2012)
September 30 – Truman Capote, American fiction writer (died 1984)
October 1 – Jimmy Carter, author and 39th President of the United States
October 3 – Harvey Kurtzman, American cartoonist and editor (died 1993)
October 5 – José Donoso, Chilean writer (died 1996)
October 29 – Zbigniew Herbert, Polish writer (died 1998)
November 21 – Christopher Tolkien, British academic and editor (died 2020)
November 22 – Rosamunde Pilcher, English novelist (died 2019)
December 29 – Francisco Nieva, Spanish playwright, novelist and short story writer (died 2016)
unknown dates
Deirdre Cash (Criena Rohan), Australian novelist (died 1963)
Mengistu Lemma, Ethiopian playwright (died 1988)

Deaths
April 21 – Marie Corelli, English author (born 1855)
May ? – Muhammad bin Fadlallah al-Sarawi, Iranian-Iraqi faqih, religious writer and poet (born  1880) 
May 1 – Lepha Eliza Bailey, American author, lecturer, and social reformer (born 1845)
May 4 – E. Nesbit, English children's author (born 1858)
June 3 – Franz Kafka, German-language author (born 1883)
June 30 – Jacob Israël de Haan, Dutch-Jewish novelist, poet and journalist (assassinated, born 1881)
August 3 – Joseph Conrad, Polish-born English novelist (born 1857)
August 25 – Velma Caldwell Melville, American editor and writer (born 1858)
August 26 – Julia Carter Aldrich, American author and editor (born 1834)
October 9
Valery Bryusov, Russian Symbolist poet, dramatist and translator (born 1873)
Lin Shu, Chinese translator (born 1852)
October 12 – Anatole France, French poet, novelist and journalist (born 1844)
October 25 – Laura Jean Libbey, American novelist (born 1862)
October 29 – Frances Hodgson Burnett, English-born children's author (born 1849)
November 21 – Paul Milliet, French dramatist and librettist (born 1848)
November 22 – Herman Heijermans, Dutch dramatist (born 1864)
December 6 – Gene Stratton-Porter, American novelist and naturalist (born 1863)
December 26 – Arnold Henry Savage Landor, English writer and artist (born 1865)
December 27 – Jennie Thornley Clarke, American educator, writer, and anthologist (born 1860)

Awards
James Tait Black Memorial Prize for fiction: E. M. Forster, A Passage to India
James Tait Black Memorial Prize for biography: Rev. William Wilson, The House of Airlie
Newbery Medal for children's literature: Charles Hawes, The Dark Frigate
Nobel Prize in Literature: Władysław Reymont
Pulitzer Prize for Drama: Hatcher Hughes, Hell-Bent Fer Heaven
Pulitzer Prize for Poetry: Robert Frost, New Hampshire: A Poem with Notes and Grace Notes
Pulitzer Prize for the Novel: Margaret Wilson, The Able McLaughlins

References

 
Years of the 20th century in literature